Philip James de Loutherbourg RA (31 October 174011 March 1812), whose name is sometimes given in the French form of Philippe-Jacques, the German form of Philipp Jakob, or with the English-language epithet of the Younger, was a French-born British painter who became known for his large naval works, his elaborate set designs for London theatres, and his invention of a mechanical theatre called the "Eidophusikon". He also had an interest in faith-healing and the occult, and was a companion of the confidence-trickster Alessandro Cagliostro.

Early life

Loutherbourg  was born in Strasbourg in 1740, the son of an expatriate Polish miniature painter. Intended for the Lutheran ministry, he was educated at the University of Strasbourg.

Paris
Rejecting a religious calling, Loutherbourg decided to become a painter, and in 1755 placed himself under Charles-André van Loo in Paris, and later under Francesco Giuseppe Casanova. His talent developed rapidly, and he became a figure in the fashionable society of the day. In 1767 he was elected to the French Academy, although below the age required by the rules of the institution, and painted landscapes, sea storms, and battles, all of which work had a celebrity above those of the specialists then working in Paris. He made his debut with the exhibition of twelve pictures, including Storm at Sunset, Night, and  Morning after Rain.

Travels
Loutherbourg then travelled through Switzerland, Germany and Italy, distinguishing himself as much by his mechanical inventions as by his painting. One of these, showing new effects produced in a model theatre, was the wonder of the day, with its use of lights behind canvas representing the moon and stars, and the illusory appearance of running water produced by clear blue sheets of metal and gauze, with loose threads of silver.

London

Theatre
In 1771 he settled in London, where David Garrick paid him £500 a year to design scenery and costumes and oversee the stage machinery at the Drury Lane Theatre. His stage effects attracted the admiration not just of the general public, but also of artists, including Joshua Reynolds. He devised scenic effects in which, for instance, green trees gradually became russet and the moon rose and lit the edges of passing clouds: illusions achieved through the use of coloured lantern-slides and the ingenious lighting of transparencies. He continued to work at the theatre until 1785.

He achieved an even greater success with an entertainment called the Eidophusikon, meaning "image of nature". This was a miniature mechanical theatre measuring six by eight feet, and described as displaying "Various Imitations of Natural Phenomena, represented by Moving Pictures". It was presented at Loutherbourg's home from March 1781 in an auditorium seating about 130 people. He used Argand lamps to light the stage and stained glass to change colours.

At Christmas, 1781, Loutherbourg mounted a spectacle at a party in the Egyptian Hall at Fonthill for William Beckford, promising (according to Beckford) to "present a mysterious something that the eye has not seen or heart of man conceived". Following this he attempted rather more fantastical subjects for the Eidophusikon, presenting a scene from Paradise Lost with "Satan arraying his troops on the banks of the Fiery Lake, and the rising of the Palace of Pandemonium". The Eidophusikon soon closed, however, as the income did not cover the costs and the audience demanded new productions faster than Loutherbourg could create them. He has been called the inventor of the panorama but, although it first appeared about the same time as the Eidophusikon, the first panorama was painted and exhibited by the Scottish painter Robert Barker.

Painting

Despite these other projects, Loutherbourg still found time for painting. Lord Howe's action, or the Glorious First of June (exhibited 1795) and other large naval pictures were commissioned to commemorate British naval victories, many of them ending up soon afterwards in the Greenwich Hospital Gallery (in whose successor, the National Maritime Museum, they still remain). His finest work was the Destruction of the Armada. He also painted the Great Fire of London and several historical works, including the Attack of the Combined Armies on Valenciennes (1793). He was interested in the Industrial Revolution, and his 1801 painting Coalbrookdale by Night shows iron foundries at work.

Seven of his paintings, including Lodore Waterfall and Skating in Hyde Park, are in the Government Art Collection.

He was made a member of the Royal Academy in 1781.

Publications

Two sets of drawings by de Loutherbourg were published, reproduced in aquatint, under the title Picturesque English Scenery in 1801 and 1805. He also contributed illustrations to a Bible published by Thomas Macklin in 1800. After his death Cadell and Davies published a volume of the Apocrypha. All 110 of his drawings for the vignettes (but not the Apocrypha) are pasted in the Bowyer Bible in Bolton Museum in Greater Manchester.

Esoteric interests
In 1789 Loutherbourg temporarily gave up painting, in order to pursue an interest in alchemy and the supernatural.  He met Alessandro Cagliostro, who instructed him in the occult. He travelled about with Cagliostro, leaving  him, however, before his condemnation to death. He and his wife also took up faith-healing. A pamphlet called A List of a Few Cures performed by Mr and Mrs De Loutherbourg, of Hammersmith Terrace, without Medicine was published in 1789. Written by a follower named Mary Pratt, it claimed that the Loutherbourgs had cured two thousand people between Christmas 1788 and the following July, "having been made proper recipients to receive divine manuductions".

Death
Loutherbourg died in Chiswick in west London in 1812.

There are paintings by him in the collections of many British institutions including Tate Britain, the Victoria and Albert Museum, the National Portrait Gallery, the Royal Academy of Art, Leicester, Farnham and Derby Art Gallery.

Loutherbourg was buried in Chiswick Old Cemetery, adjoining the graveyard of St Nicholas Church, Chiswick. Buried nearby are the artists William Hogarth and James Abbott McNeill Whistler.

Further reading
 Burden, Michael. "The Making and Marketing of the Georgian Apotheosis:  Carter, Strange, Rebecca, Tresham, and de Loutherbourg". The British Art Journal, 22/1 (2021) pp. 10–17. 
 Joppier, Rudiger (1973). Philippe Jacques de Loutherbourg, R.A., 1740-1812. London: Greater London Council.
 Dobson, Austin. At Prior Park and Other Papers. London: Humphrey Milford Oxford University Press, 1923. Print.

References

External links
 
 
 
 Adventures in Cybersound: Philippe Jacques de Loutherberg

1740 births
1812 deaths
18th-century English painters
English male painters
19th-century English painters
Landscape artists
Artists from Strasbourg
Royal Academicians
French emigrants to the Kingdom of Great Britain
History painters
Military art
French emigrants to England
French people of Polish descent
English people of Polish descent
19th-century English male artists
18th-century English male artists